The Turkish Cricket Board is the official governing body of the sport of cricket in Turkey. It is Turkey's representative at the International Cricket Council and is an associate member and has been a member of that body since 2008. It is also a member of the European Cricket Council.

References

External links 
 Cricinfo-Turkey

Cricket administration
Cricket
2008 establishments in Turkey